The Kenmore-Town of Tonawanda Union Free School District, also called the Ken-Ton School District, or simply Ken-Ton Schools,  serves Kenmore and a majority of the Town of Tonawanda in New York State.  It is one of the largest in Western New York.

Central Office Location 
The district Central Office is located at 1500 Colvin Blvd.

Current Administrators 

Sabatino Cimato; Superintendent of Schools

Kelly White; Assistant Superintendent of Instruction
Elaine Ablove, Staff Development Center Director
Lisa Cross; Executive Director of Secondary Education 
Heather Fleming; Director of Technology Integration 
Anne Martell; Director of K-12 Education
Michael Muscarella; Executive Director of Elementary Education
Frank Spagnolo, Director of Informational Data and Accountability/CIO

Tracy Spagnolo; Assistant Superintendent of Student Services
Christine Barth; Director of Secondary Special Education
Ashley Digati; Director of Elementary Special Education
Dina Ferraraccio; Director of School Culture

Jeffery Richards; Assistant Superintendent of Human Resources
Liza Acanfora, Director of Adult & Community Education 
Patrick Moses, Director of Personnel

Nicole Morasco; Assistant Superintendent of Finance
Timothy Ames, Director of Facilities
Michael Klemann, Interim Supervisor of Transportation
Kim Roll, Director of Food Services

Brett Banker; Director of Health, Physical Education, and Athletics
Lindsay Bergman, Assistant Director
Debra Carey, Medical Director

Former Superintendents 
The following individuals have served as Superintendent of Schools of the Kenmore-Town of Tonawanda Union Free School District:
Frank C. Densberger, 1915-1953
Carl Baisch, 1953-1963 
C. Sherwood Miller, 1963-1975
Philip Tieman, 1975-1979 
Richard Lane, 1979-1980 
John Helfrich, 1981-1994
Robert Freeland, 1994
Robert McClure, 1994-1998
Robert Fort, 1998
David Paciencia, 1998-2000
Steven Achramovitch, 2001-2006
Anne Marotta, 2006-2007
Mark Mondanaro, 2007-2014
Dawn Mirand, 2014-2017
Stephen Bovino, 2017-2020

Open Schools
At its enrollment peak the district housed 22,000 students in 23 school buildings. The district now operates 9
schools with an enrollment of 6,875. As of 2016, the five Elementary schools house grades Pre-K to 4th Grade, Middle schools house grades 5 through 7, and  High schools grades 8 through 12.

Kenmore East High School (Built and opened in 1959)
Kenmore West Senior High School (Built in 1938 and opened in the fall of 1940)
Kenmore Big Picture High School (Built in 1923 and opened and dedicated on November 18, 1924, as the original Kenmore High School)
Benjamin Franklin Middle School (Built in 1952)
Herbert Hoover Middle School (Built and dedicated on October 10, 1951)
Thomas A. Edison Elementary School (Built in 1954) 
Benjamin Franklin Elementary School (Built in 1952)
Oliver Wendell Holmes Elementary School (Built in 1964) 
Herbert Hoover Elementary School (Built and dedicated on October 10, 1951) 
Charles E. Lindbergh Elementary School (Opened in September 1930)
Alexander Hamilton School (Built in 1958) Closed on June 21, 2016, re-opened in the Fall of 2021 as the district's Pre-K Building.

Closed Schools
Warren G. Harding Elementary School (River Rd. Town of Tonawanda,) built in 1920, opened in 1921 and sold in 1956 to the Town Boys and Girls Club
Dewitt Clinton Elementary School (McConkey Dr. Town of Tonawanda) Grades K-6, closed in 1974, now New Covenant Tabernacle 
Horace Mann Elementary School (Westchester Blvd. Town of Tonawanda) Grades K-6, closed 1976 now Westchester Park Apartments for Seniors
Robert Frost Elementary School (Ensminger Rd., Town of Tonawanda) Grades K-3, closed 1977 now Town of Tonawanda Senior Citizens Center
Heritage Elementary School (169 Heritage Rd. Town of Tonawanda,) Grades K-3, closed in 1974, building sold to People Inc. 
Jane Addams Elementary School (Cortland Ave & Belcher Ave Town of Tonawanda) Grades K-3, closed 1978, demolished to build Center Court Commons 28 residential homes
Betsy Ross Elementary School (Wilber Ave & Mang Ave Kenmore, NY) Grades K-2, closed 1980, now owned by Village of Kenmore and operates as a Community Center
Longfellow Elementary School (Myron Ave. Kenmore, NY), Grades K-3, closed 1981, now operates as School District use
Abraham Lincoln Elementary School (Wendel Ave & Cambridge St. Town of Tonawanda, NY) Opened 1924, Grades K-6, closed 1981 now a Stanley G. Falk School
Lincoln House Annex, closed in 1977
Green Acres Elementary School (Yorkshire Rd. & Pryor Ave. Town of Tonawanda, NY) Grades K-6, closed 1981 now owned by Heritage Centers
Brighton Elementary School (Eggert Rd. & Fries Rd. Town of Tonawanda, NY), Grades K-6, closed 1978, and demolished to build Brighton Senior Square Apartments
Philip Sheridan Elementary School (Elmwood Ave. Town of Tonawanda) closed 1982, used by school district programs from 1982–2018, and sold to CMS rentals for Senior Housing.
Sheridan Parkside Elementary School (Sheridan Parkside Drive, Town of Tonawanda) Built in 1955, closed 1982 now owned by Town of Tonawanda and operates as a Community Center, Head Start, Home of the Towne Players Theater Co, Meals on Wheels, the Erie Count Labor Board and Work Readiness Skills, and the Town of Tonawanda Historical Society. 
Sheridan Annex, Closed in 1975
George Washington Elementary School (Delaware Ave. & Delaware Rd. Kenmore) closed 1982 converted to luxury apartments 
Jefferson Elementary School (Athens Blvd., Town of Tonawanda) Built and opened in 1956, closed in 2013. The district rents the space to the Ken-Ton Closet and the Town of Tonawanda Youth/Teen Center. 
Theodore Roosevelt Elementary School (283 Washington Ave.) Opening in 1928 and closing on June 21, 2016, now owned by Stanley G. Falk School
Kenmore Middle School (155 Delaware Road.) closed on June 21, 2016, now home of the Kenmore Education Center, housing the Big Picture High School program, Adult and Community Education, and the Staff Development Center.

References

External links
 

Education in Erie County, New York
School districts in New York (state)